is a male long-distance runner from Japan. Born in Kazuno, Akita, he set his personal best (2:10:51) in the men's marathon event on February 18, 2001, winning the Tokyo International Marathon.

Achievements

References

1973 births
People from Kazuno, Akita
Japanese male long-distance runners
Living people
Sportspeople from Akita Prefecture
Japanese male marathon runners